The Stits SA-3A Playboy (also called the Stitts SA-3A Playboy) is a single seat, strut-braced low-wing monoplane that was designed by Ray Stits for amateur construction. The aircraft was designed and the prototype was completed in a three-month period during 1952. The design went on to become one of the most influential in the post-war boom in aircraft homebuilding.

A side-by-side two seat version is known as the SA-3B.

Design and development
The Playboy was the third of fifteen different aircraft designs created by Stits, who migrated in the 1960s from selling plans to developing the Polyfiber line of aircraft coverings and related paint formulas.

The Playboy was designed to be constructed from either plans or from a series of partial kits. The construction is mixed  with the fuselage made from welded steel and the wings built from wood. The aircraft is fabric-covered and incorporates a sliding canopy. The aircraft is unusual in that the low wings are strut-braced.

The first in the series of Van's Aircraft designed by Richard VanGrunsven, the Van's Aircraft RV-1 was a modified Playboy and directly led to the Van's Aircraft RV-3 and the highly successful RV line of aircraft.

Operational history

Having been sold in 1955, the prototype Playboy passed through several owners' hands before being donated to the Experimental Aircraft Association.  Ray Stits was the first member of Chapter 1.  That plane is now in the EAA Airventure Museum in Oshkosh, Wisconsin.

Canada's first licensed amateur-built aircraft was a highly modified Playboy that was built by Keith S. Hopkinson. Hopkinson used the basic Playboy design and incorporated a Piper J-3 cowling, a Cessna 170 propeller spinner, de Havilland Tiger Moth wing struts, Cessna 140 conventional landing gear and Stinson 108 wheel pants.

In March 2010 there were still 41 Playboys registered in the US, six in Canada and two in the UK.

Variants
SA-3A
Single seat version, powered by an  Continental C85
SA-3B
Two seats in side-by-side configuration version, powered by a  Lycoming O-235
Super Playboy
A one-off design with two foot wing extensions powered by a  Franklin
VanGrunsven RV-1
A  Lycoming O-290G powered, cantilever aluminium winged modification of an SA-3A.

Aircraft on display
 Canada Aviation Museum - first Canadian homebuilt aircraft, modified Playboy C-FRAD
 EAA AirVenture Museum - prototype Playboy N8KK

Specifications (SA-3A)

See also

References

External links

Photo of a Stits Playboy

1950s United States sport aircraft
Homebuilt aircraft
Low-wing aircraft
Aircraft first flown in 1952